Belvedere Langhe is a comune (municipality) in the Province of Cuneo in the Italian region Piedmont, located about  southeast of Turin and about  northeast of Cuneo.

Belvedere Langhe borders the following municipalities: Bonvicino, Clavesana, Dogliani, Farigliano, and Murazzano.

Demographic evolution

References 

Cities and towns in Piedmont